Ehrharta calycina is a species of grass known by the common names perennial veldtgrass and purple veldtgrass.

Distribution
It is native to southern Africa; from South Africa (within the Cape Provinces, Free State and KwaZulu-Natal), Lesotho and Namibia.

It grows in Veld grassland habits and on low-lying sandy areas.

Description
Ehrharta calycina is a highly variable perennial grass, often but not always rhizomatous.

It usually reaches  in height, but is known to grow much taller in favorable conditions.

The inflorescence is a narrow to wide open array of spikelets light in color when new and becoming darker and tinted purple to reddish with age.

Taxonomy
The Latin specific epithet of calycina is derived from calycinus meaning like a calyx or with a prominent calyx. It was first described and published in Pl. Icon. Ined. on table 33 in 1789.

Introduced / invasive species
The grass is an introduced species, including places such as; California, Egypt, Hawaii, India, New South Wales, New Zealand North, Portugal, South Australia, Spain, Tasmania, Texas, Tunisia, Victoria and Western Australia. Sometimes becoming a noxious weed outside its native range. 

It is an invasive species in California, where it is an invasive weed of chaparral and coastal sage scrub habitat along the southern and central coastal regions. It was first introduced to Davis in the Sacramento Valley as a drought-tolerant range grass for grazing.

It is also known as an invasive species and weed in parts of Australia.

The species has been added to the list of invasive alien species of Union Concern. This means it is now forbidden to trade, import and breed this plant in all Member States of the European Union.

References

External links
Jepson Manual Treatment — invasive plant species in California.
USDA Plants Profile — invasive plant species in U.S.
UC CalPhoto gallery of Ehrharta calycina

Oryzoideae
Grasses of Africa
Grasses of South Africa
Flora of Southern Africa
Taxa named by James Edward Smith
Plants described in 1789